Dwight Phillips (born October 1, 1977) is an American former athlete and a four-time world champion in the long jump. He was the 2004 Olympic champion in the event. His personal best of 8.74 meters, set in 2009, makes him the joint fifth best jumper of all time.

Phillips has also competed in the 60 and 100-meter dashes. His personal record for the 100 m is 10.06 seconds and his time of 6.47 seconds over 60 m ranks among the top twenty fastest ever.

He is a now a track and field ambassador at SPIRE Institute and Academy. He will be joining the others such as Elizabeth Beisel and Caeleb Dressel representing the school. The goal of the partnership with SPIRE and the ambassadors is to emphasize the development of peak performance in athletics, academics, character and life.

Career
Phillips was a promising sprinter in his early days, but concentrated on the triple jump while at University of Kentucky, before switching to the long jump after moving to Arizona State University in 2000. He competed at 2000 Sydney Olympics and finished eighth in the long jump with a jump of 8.06 m. He was the best American performer in the event. At his first World Championships he again finished eighth, after sustaining a hamstring tear.

He came to prominence in 2003, when he won both the IAAF indoor and outdoor World Championships. The indoor championship event was a close contest, with Phillips only beating Spain's Yago Lamela by a centimeter. He won the outdoor title with a winning margin of four centimeters over James Beckford of Jamaica.

In the run up to the 2004 Athens Olympics, Phillips was ranked number one in the world, and he won the gold medal by a margin of 12 cm over his compatriot John Moffitt. His winning jump of 8.59 meters was the fourth biggest in Olympic history, after Bob Beamon (1968) and Carl Lewis (1988, 1992).

His success continued at the next two World Championships, taking the gold medal at the 2005 Helsinki event, and winning bronze in Osaka two years later.

Phillips finished fourth in the long jump at the U.S. Olympic Trials, meaning he would not compete at the Beijing Olympics and would not defend his Olympic title.

On June 7, 2009, Phillips won the long jump at the Prefontaine Classic with a personal-best third jump of 8.74 m, defeating 2008 Olympic gold medalist Irving Saladino. A jump that put Phillips in the all-time performers top 10, despite a 1.2 metres/second headwind. He won the US Championships later that month, giving him another chance to reach the podium at the World Championships.

At the 2009 World Athletics Championships, in Berlin, Phillips won the gold in the long jump with a jump of 8.54 m. He repeated the feat in Daegu in 2011 with a leap of 8.45 m. During the championships in Daegu, Phillips was assigned the bib number 1111. After winning, Phillips proudly pointed to the number appropriate for finishing first in four championships.

A car accident just before the start of the 2012 outdoor season left him with back and neck injuries. Further to this, an Achilles tendon injury recurred and instead of preparing for the 2012 London Olympics, Phillips opted to undergo surgery to prolong his career.

At the 2013 World Athletics Championships, in Moscow, Phillips placed 11th in the long jump with a jump of 7.88 m and announced this was his last competition and retirement.

In 2018, Phillips was inducted into the National Track and Field Hall of Fame.

In September 2020, SPIRE Institute and Academy signed Phillips to become an international track and field ambassador.

Personal life
Phillips is currently CEO and partner at Epiq.tv.Phillips is also the founder of The winners circles.

Personal bests

All information from IAAF Profile

Achievements

References

External links
 
 
 
 Dwight Phillips' U.S. Olympic Team bio



1977 births
Living people
American male long jumpers
Athletes (track and field) at the 1999 Pan American Games
Athletes (track and field) at the 2000 Summer Olympics
Athletes (track and field) at the 2004 Summer Olympics
Olympic gold medalists for the United States in track and field
African-American male track and field athletes
Arizona State University alumni
People from Decatur, Georgia
Sportspeople from DeKalb County, Georgia
Track and field athletes from Georgia (U.S. state)
World Athletics Championships medalists
Medalists at the 2004 Summer Olympics
Diamond League winners
USA Outdoor Track and Field Championships winners
World Athletics Indoor Championships winners
IAAF Continental Cup winners
World Athletics Championships winners
Pan American Games track and field athletes for the United States
21st-century African-American sportspeople
20th-century African-American sportspeople